Emil Beck (20 July 1935, Tauberbischofsheim – 12 March 2006) was a German fencing coach.

Biography

Emil Beck was born in Tauberbischofsheim, in the Main-Tauber-District of Baden-Württemberg in Germany on 12 July 1935. The former hairdresser Emil Beck began in the mid-1950s with fencing. Fencing scenes from the movie The Three Musketeers had impressed the young man. In 1954 Emil Beck was the "founding father" of the Fencing-Club Tauberbischofsheim. He created a school of fencing sometimes referred to as the "German school" since Beck's influence on German fencing was profound. As a fencing coach, Beck was largely self-taught.

Considering Becks medal success, he is one of the most successful coaches in the world (with 163 medals at Olympic Games, World Championships and European Championships). Beck coined the reputation of the Fencing-Club Tauberbischofsheim in the 1970s as "Tauberbischofsheimer goldsmith" and "Mecca of fencing".

Beck trained fencers such as Matthias Behr, Alexander Pusch and Anja Fichtel. At the height of his career, the German fencers Anja Fichtel, Sabine Bau and Zita Funkenhauser – all from the FC Tauberbischofsheim – won gold, silver and bronze in foil at the 1988 Olympics in Seoul. Beck was succeeded as German fencing team leader by Matthias Behr.

12 March 2006 Emil Beck died of heart failure.

Honours
 "Honorary medal" of the Fédération Internationale d'Escrime (International Fencing Federation).
 honorary citizen of Tauberbischofsheim, 23 June 1989.

Beck as a name giver
 "Emil Beck Memorial Award"; with this award the Fencing-Club Tauberbischofsheim honors personalities who have done something extraordinary and outstanding for fencing.
 "Emil-Beck-Hall" in Tauberbischofsheim

Quotes about Beck
Some quotes of famous personalities about Beck illustrate his life's work at the Fencing-Club Tauberbischofsheim:

The honorary president of the German Fencing Association (DFeB), Gordon Rapp, paid tribute to Becks commitment as:

Works
 Emil Beck: Tauberbischofsheimer Fechtlektionen für Anfänger und Fortgeschrittene. Philippka-Verlag, Münster 1987, .
 Emil Beck: Richtig Fechten. BLV Verlag, München 1990, .
 Emil Beck: Fechten. Florett, Degen, Säbel. Falken-Verlag, Niedernhausen im Taunus 1995, .
 Emil Beck, Berndt Barth: Fechttraining. Meyer-Verlag, Aachen 2004, .
 Emil Beck (editor), Berndt Barth (editor): The Complete Guide to Fencing, 366 pages, Meyer & Meyer, Aachen 2006, .

References

External links
 
 
 Emil Beck - The Complete Guide to Fencing Meyer & Meyer Verlag, 1 Sep 2006 

1935 births
2006 deaths
People from Tauberbischofsheim
Sportspeople from Stuttgart (region)
German male fencers
Officers Crosses of the Order of Merit of the Federal Republic of Germany
20th-century German people
21st-century German people